Pellegrini's Espresso Bar is a café on Bourke Street in Melbourne, Australia, described as "one of Melbourne's most iconic destinations, in a city that prides itself on coffee and fine food". The café was established in 1954 by Leo and Vildo Pellegrini - brothers and migrants from Italy. The brothers had worked at Florentino's, a popular Italian restaurant on Bourke Street before establishing their own coffee bar nearby. The bar is claimed to be the first in Melbourne to use an espresso machine, although many cafés in the Italian-Australian neighbourhood of Lygon Street in Carlton acquired machines at around the same time.

The café, originally tiny, expanded in 1958 and the heritage-listed neon sign at one stage pointed to a rear area on Crossley Street that is now closed. The café was originally patronised primarily by the Italian migrant community but soon became a popular spot for "theatre people, intellectuals and, eventually, tourists".

Pellegrini's was sold to Nino Pangrazio and Sisto Malaspina in 1974, also Italian migrants. The new owners worked with the Pellegrini brothers for three months in the transition, to ensure that quality would be maintained. Pangrazio and Malaspina claim that little has changed in that time with the decor, the menu and the cooking style remaining the same.

In 2014, Pellegrini's was inducted into the Good Café Guide Hall of Fame. The café is listed by the National Trust of Australia.

Co-owner of the café, Sisto Malaspina, was murdered during the 2018 Melbourne stabbing attack, which prompted a significant outpouring of grief, with mourners leaving flowers and signing a tribute book to Malaspina. Victorian Premier Daniel Andrews, who described Sisto Malaspina as a "Victorian icon", announced that Malaspina's family had accepted his offer of a state funeral. The City of Melbourne also confirmed it was considering suggestions to rename Crossley Street, which corners Pellegrini's in honour of Malaspina, telling The Age that "In the coming weeks, the City of Melbourne will consider a range of measures to recognise the life of Sisto Malaspina." A memorial table was installed on Bourke Street, outside the café, in his honour in 2020. It features the words "Sisto of Pelligrini's" and his portrait, alongside a plaque that reads, in part, ""The outpouring of grief that followed Sisto Malaspina's death during a terror-related incident in Bourke Street would have surprised Sisto more than anyone else. Yet the response made sense: Sisto loved Melbourne - and Melbourne loved him back."

In 2020, during the Covid pandemic, Sisto's son, David, and wife, Vicki, bought out Nino Pangrazio. David currently manages the café.

References

External links
 

1954 establishments in Australia
Coffeehouses and cafés in Australia
Italian-Australian culture in Melbourne
Restaurants in Melbourne
Italian restaurants in Australia
Buildings and structures in Melbourne City Centre
Bourke Street